Gillespie Gap (el. ), also known as Etchoe Pass, is a mountain pass along the Blue Ridge Mountains.  Historically, two events occurred at the pass.  The first was in 1761 when thirty men, under the command of Francis Marion, were sent to dislodge an encampment of Cherokee warriors at the pass; ambushed, Marion lost twenty-one men.  The second was in 1780 when the Overmountain Men crossed the pass on their way to Kings Mountain.

NC 226 traverses through the gap, which connects Marion and Spruce Pine.  Intersecting at the gap is NC 226A, which goes to nearby Little Switzerland.  The Blue Ridge Parkway (milepost 330.9) also passes through the gap, providing scenic views along the adjacent ridge lines.  The gap is also along the Eastern Continental Divide and the McDowell–Mitchell county line.

References

Landforms of McDowell County, North Carolina
Landforms of Mitchell County, North Carolina
Mountain passes of North Carolina
Transportation in McDowell County, North Carolina
Transportation in Mitchell County, North Carolina
Blue Ridge Parkway